Cecryphalus helenae is a moth in the family Cossidae. It is found in Morocco.

References

External links
Natural History Museum Lepidoptera generic names catalog

Zeuzerinae